Marie Dupayage (born 9 August 2000) is a French ice dancer. With her skating partner, Thomas Nabais, she is the 2023 World University Games champion and has won two bronze medals at ISU Challenger Series events (2022 CS Nepela Memorial and 2022 CS Warsaw Cup).

Personal life 
Dupayage was born on 9 August 2000 in Saint-Martin-d'Hères, France, a suburb of Grenoble.

Career

Early years 
Dupayage began learning to skate in 2004. Skating with Thomas Nabais, she made her junior international debut in November 2016 at the Tallinn Trophy. Dupayage/Nabais placed 14th at their first ISU Junior Grand Prix (JGP) event, JGP Austria, in late August 2017. Their best JGP results were seventh in Latvia and Italy in September and October 2019, respectively.

2021–22 season 
Dupayage/Nabais' senior international debut came in October 2021; they placed fifth at the Trophée Métropole Nice Côte d'Azur and had the same result at the 2021 CS Denis Ten Memorial Challenge. In December, they finished fourth at the French Championships. In January 2022, they won silver at the Bavarian Open in Oberstdorf, Germany.

2022–23 season 
Dupayage/Nabais began their season by winning bronze at the 2022 CS Nepela Memorial and then silver at the Trophée Métropole Nice Côte d'Azur in October. In November, they placed ninth at the 2022 Grand Prix de France, their first Grand Prix appearance, and then took bronze at the 2022 CS Warsaw Cup.

Programs

With Nabais

Competitive highlights 
GP: Grand Prix; CS: Challenger Series; JGP: Junior Grand Prix

With Nabais

References

External links 
 

2000 births
Living people
French female ice dancers
People from Saint-Martin-d'Hères
Competitors at the 2023 Winter World University Games
Medalists at the 2023 Winter World University Games
Universiade medalists in figure skating
Universiade gold medalists for France